Interstate 15 (I-15) is an Interstate Highway, running from San Diego, California, United States, to the Canada–US border, through Mohave County in northwest Arizona. The highway heads in a northeasterly direction from the Nevada border northeast of Mesquite, Nevada, to the Utah border southwest of St. George, Utah.

The south portion of I-15's route was built close to the alignment of the old U.S. Route 91 (US 91), but the northern section, through the Virgin River Gorge, was built along roadless terrain. The southern section of the highway was complete and open in the early 1960s, but the gorge section was inaccessible until 1973. When it opened, the Virgin River Gorge passage was the most expensive section of rural Interstate per mile.

Route description 

The highway is signed and designated the Veterans Memorial Highway, a designation which continues into Utah. Traffic volume along the Arizona section of I-15 is approximately 23,000 vehicles per day. The highway is also a part of the CANAMEX Corridor, a trade corridor in North America linking Edmonton, Alberta, in Canada and Mexico City.

The highway enters the state in Mohave County northeast of Mesquite and Las Vegas, Nevada, paralleling the old US 91 heading northeast on an alignment north of the Virgin River. I-15 parallels the Virgin River for its entire length in Arizona, but the terrain abruptly becomes more rugged at mile 13, where the Virgin River Gorge begins. The first interchange is exit 8 at Littlefield, where old US 91 turns north to avoid the gorge. I-15 crosses the river for the first time just beyond Littlefield, and soon passes another interchange serving local roads eastward. This exit, exit 9, is a right-in/right-out design with frontage roads, constructed after the initial opening. Access under I-15 is provided just south of the ramps.

Beyond exit 9, I-15 enters the Virgin River Gorge, first passing through "The Narrows". Several pulloffs allow access to these cliffs. Within the canyon, through which it ascends northbound and descends southbound, five bridges cross the river. The highway generally follows the winding course of the river, but several rock cuts bypass bends.

The canyon opens up slightly at the Cedar Pocket interchange (exit 18), allowing for a rest area. This rest area was turned over to the federal Bureau of Land Management in 2002 which maintains the nearby Virgin River Gorge Recreation Area. The rest area was demolished in 2009. I-15 continues to parallel the Virgin River, but begins to deviate more. Trees here include tamarix, ash, cottonwoods, willows, and Joshua trees. Wildflowers, such as globemallow, desert marigold, and sand verbena, dot the route in springtime. At mile 22.5, the highway crosses the Virgin River for the final time, continuing east along the smaller Black Rock Gulch before then turning slightly northeast into a flatter area. The final interchange (exit 27) provides local access.

A weigh station/port of entry formerly served both sides of the road near mile 28 before the Utah state line. The weigh station/port of entry are now combined into a joint Arizona–Utah facility just north of the state line staffed by the Arizona Department of Transportation (DOT) Motor Vehicle Division and Utah DOT Motor Carrier Division. I-15 continues on into Utah providing access to St. George as well as Salt Lake City.

History 

The Old Spanish Trail from Southern California had two routes through northwestern Arizona, splitting at Littlefield; one went north toward central Utah, and the other went northeast through the Virgin River Gorge, straddling the state line to the Four Corners area. When the Arrowhead Trail was marked in the 1920s, and US 91 in 1926, automobile travelers between Nevada and Utah followed the northerly routing, turning east in Utah to reach St. George.

When the Interstates were planned, federal authorities decided to save  over US 91 and pass through the Virgin River Gorge to take advantage of its scenery and lower grades for trucks. Construction was completed first, in the early 1960s, on the portion between Nevada and the gorge. The bridges over Big Bend Wash were completed in 1962. The bridge over the Virgin River near Littlefield was completed by 1964. By 1965, the overpass over Black Rock Road (northward) was finally complete.

Construction through the gorge was slower and much more difficult, and the segment could not fully open until December 14, 1973. To help quicken construction, the state of Utah loaned a portion of their federal highway funds to Arizona. Even though the highway is of little importance to the transportation needs of Arizona, as it does not link any Arizona communities, it does serve as a vital link between Salt Lake City and Las Vegas and Los Angeles to the southwest. Despite extra funding, however, challenges remained. Flash flooding and quicksand in the gorge repeatedly caused problems, with equipment and materials apparently disappearing overnight. Worse, the project was to claim a life, when in October 1969, a helicopter performing reconnaissance on the gorge crashed due to wind, killing the pilot. To help navigate the gorge's rugged and unforgiving terrain, a special piece of equipment, called a swamp buggy, had to be brought from Texas. Even with this help, the route still demanded construction of four bridges over Virgin River. The westernmost bridge and the bridge carrying the northbound lanes at the third bridge location from the west were completed in 1972. By 1973, all five bridges were finally complete.

Even before its opening, it was promoted as the most scenic highway in the state: a 1988 article in Arizona Highways said that the project "enhanced rather than distracted from Nature's handiwork".

Exit list

See also

References

External links 

 Arizona
15
Transportation in Mohave County, Arizona